Anne Roberts is a retired journalism instructor and former Vancouver city councillor. She was elected as a member of the winning majority of Coalition of Progressive Electors in 2002.

Before serving on the city council, Roberts was active in education issues as chair of her children's parent advisory committees and as chair of the District Parent Representatives at the Vancouver School Board, on which she was an elected trustee.

In council, Roberts was among the five left-wing councillors dubbed "COPE Classic" by Charlie Smith at The Georgia Straight to distinguish them from "COPE Lite"—the three COPE councillors and Mayor Larry Campbell who split the party to form the centrist Vision Vancouver party. Chair of the Planning and Environment Committee, Roberts was appointed by council as a delegate to the Greater Vancouver Regional District. On council, she spearheaded expansion of child care spaces, advocated that transit money to be spent on buses rather than mega-projects such as RAV (now called the Canada Line), and convinced a majority of city council to deny Wal-Mart's application to build a new store. Roberts also opposed expanded gambling in the city and the 2010 Olympics. Roberts ran for re-election in 2005 placing 19th among 36 candidates with 41,739 votes, thus losing her seat.

References

Year of birth missing (living people)
Living people
American emigrants to Canada
Coalition of Progressive Electors councillors
Canadian women journalists
Women municipal councillors in Canada
Women in British Columbia politics
Canadian women non-fiction writers